Education in Georgia may refer to:

Education in Georgia (country)
Education in Georgia (U.S. state)